The battle of Balkh was a key success in Timur's rise to power, and established him as the ruler of the western Chagatai Khanate in Transoxiana.

Background

Rise to power
Twelve years earlier, Timur (known in the West as Tamerlane) had been a minor member of the Barlas tribe, one of many tribes in the western part of the Chagatai Khanate. Since the 1330s, the Khanate had been split in two, between Mawarannahr (Transoxiana) in the west and Moghulistan in the east. Between 1347 and 1358, Mawarannahr was ruled by Amir Qazaghan, but in 1358 he was assassinated on the orders of Tughlugh Timur, Khan of Moghulistan. This was followed by an invasion from Moghulistan. Hajji Beg, ruler of the Barlas tribe, decided to flee, but Timur offered his services to the Moghuls, as a result becoming head of the tribe.

Going underground
Timur's period as a Moghul vassal came to an end when Tughlugh Timur appointed his son Ilyas Khoja as governor of Mawarannahr. Timur and Husayn both rebelled, going underground. Over the next few years, Timur survived as a bandit and a mercenary, and it was probably during this period that he suffered the wounds that caused his famous lameness (possible origin of the name Tamerlane). In 1365, Ilyas Khoja returned at the head of an army, defeating Timur and Husayn at the battle of Tashkent. Husayn's failure to support Timur during this battle probably played a part in the eventual end of their alliance, but for the moment the two men remained together. Ilyas Khoja was unable to take advantage of his victory. He advanced to besiege Samarkand, but was repulsed and forced to retreat back into Moghulistan, where in 1369 his family was overthrown.

Control of Samarkand
In the aftermath of this failed siege, Timur and Husayn were able to seize control of Samarkand. Something of a 'cold war' period seems to have followed, with the two men uniting against further Moghul threats, but fighting amongst themselves the rest of the time. Timur seems to have been more successful at building up support than Husayn, successfully maintaining a balance between the nomads who formed the core of his army and the more settled city dwellers. In contrast Husayn alienated many of the nomads by rebuilding the city and citadel of Balkh, at the south-western edge of the Chagatai Khanate. This city had an ancient history and had been one of the jewels of the Islamic world before being destroyed by Genghis Khan in 1220. It was still uninhabited in 1333, and Husayn's decision to rebuild will have worried his nomad supporters, who traditionally preferred their leaders to rely on the strength of their troops and not on fortifications (similar disputes had hastened the original split in the Chagatai Khanate).

Battle
In 1370 (some sources say 1369), Timur decided to attack Husayn at Balkh. After crossing the Amu Darya at Termez his army surrounded the reconstructed city. Husayn's army came out of the city to attack Timur's men, perhaps suggesting that they were unhappy to find themselves being besieged. The same occurred on the second day of the battle, but this time Timur's men managed to get into the city. Husayn shut himself up inside the citadel, leaving Timur's men to sack the city.

Realising that he could no long hope to win, Husayn offered to leave Mawarannahr and go on a pilgrimage to Mecca if Timur spared his life. Tamerlane agreed to these terms, but Husayn was not convinced that he could be trusted. After an unsuccessful attempt to hide from Timur's men Husayn was finally captured and handed over to Timur. He kept to the letter of his promise - Husayn was killed by Kay-Khusrau, a chief who had a blood feud with him.

Aftermath
The defeat of Husayn made Timur the main power in Mawarannahr and western Chagatai, but the laws laid down by Genghis Khan prevented him from become Khan in his own right. Instead a 'puppet' khan descended from Ögedei, Soyurgatmish, was installed. Timur increased his own legitimacy by marrying Husayn's widow Saray Mulk, a princess descended from Genghis Khan. She became his most important Queen, and allowed Timur to call himself Temur Gurgan, or 'son-in-law of the Great Khan'. This form of his name was used on his coins, in Friday prayers, and at ceremonial officials for the rest of his life.

Balkh was looted and the citadel and palace destroyed. Despite this, Timur chose Balkh as the site for a ceremony in which the tribal leaders of the western Chagatai agreed to accept his rule. Timur spent most of the next decade securing his authority over the Chagatai as well as on campaigns in the east, before beginning his famous series of conquests during the 1380s.

References 
The Timurid Dynasty 
 René Grousset, L'empire des Steppes, versio francesa 1938 reedició 4ª 1965, i versió anglesa 1970. 
 Hodong Kim, "The Early History of the Moghul Nomads: The Legacy of the Chaghatai Khanate." The Mongol Empire and Its Legacy. Ed. Reuven Amitai-Preiss i David Morgan. Leiden: Brill, 1998. 
 Beatrice Forbes Manz, The Rise and Rule of Tamerlane. Cambridge University Press: Cambridge, 1989. 
 Mirza Muhammad Haidar. The Tarikh-i-Rashidi (A History of the Moghuls of Central Asia). Traduit per Edward Denison Ross, editat per N. Elias. Londres, 1895.

Balkh
Balkh
1370 in Asia
History of Balkh Province
Balkh
Balkh